Alina Elena Bercu (born 9 February 1990, in Câmpina, Prahova, Romania) is a Romanian concert pianist.

Life
She started her first piano lessons at the age of 7 at the Arts School in her native town.

In 1999 she settled with her family in Brasov, Transylvania, to study piano with Professor Stela Drăgulin from the Faculty of Music.
Aged only 16, she passed the entrance examination at the Franz Liszt Music University in Weimar, Germany, becoming Grigory Gruzman’s student. She attends in parallel the courses of the National College Andrei Saguna in Brasov.

She gave her first concert with an orchestra at only 9, and soon performed at noted stages in Europe, America and Asia including: The Romanian Athenaeum and Mihail Jora Studio from the Radio Broadcast Hall in Bucharest, Tonhalle Düsseldorf, Teo Otto Theater - Remscheid, Prinzregententheater München, Musikhalle-Hamburg, Auditorium - Rome, Tonhalle Zürich, Carnegie Hall and Theatre du Vevey. Bercu has given more than 200 concerts with widely known orchestras and made recordings for several European broadcasters.

Education

Schools

 1998–2005–secondary school at the Normal School No. 6 from Brasov
 1998–2006 in Brasov – private piano courses with Prof. Stela Drăgulin from the Faculty of Music in Transilvania University of Brașov
 2005–2009 student at The National College Andrei Saguna Brasov- “social sciences” section
 2006–student at The University of Music Franz Liszt in Weimar with Prof. Grigory Gruzman

Piano Master classes

 July 2000 – Braşov, Romania “Summer Academy” with Lory Wallfisch (USA)
 July 2005–Zürich, Switzerland “International Master Class for Piano” with Rudolf Buchbinder (DE)
 March 2007– Weimar, Germany “Klavier-Akademie “ with Leslie Howard (UK)
 August 2010 Salzburg, Austria "Internationale Sommerakademie Mozarteum" with  Karl-Heinz Kämmerling (DE)

Contests and prizes
 27 May 2011, Italy – Alina Bercu (pf) and Dragos Manza (vl) in ensemble DUO ENESCU, the 3rd Prize, Central European Initiative (CEI) Special Award and Young Award 2011 at the 12th International Competition for Chamber Music Ensembles “Premio Trio di Trieste”
 11 September 2007, Vevey, Switzerland – finalist at the 22nd Clara Haskil International Piano Competition
 28 May 2007, Calabria, Italy – The 17th International Piano Competition A.M.A. Calabria the Third Prize
 12 May 2006, Vienna, Austria – Laureate of the 13th edition of the Eurovision Young Musicians Competition 2006
 19 January 2006 Bucharest – Romanian Television The National Contest for ”Eurovision Young Musicians 2006”: The First Prize and the “Great Winner” to represent Romania in the European Contest “Eurovision Young Musicians Competition 2006”
 4 July 2004 Cincinnati – Ohio, USA: "The 2004 World Piano Competition": the First Prize for "solo" section, the First Prize for the "concerto" section, the Gold Medal & Grand Prize Winner
 2 November 2002 Hamburg, Germany – International Piano Competition "Steinway & Sons": the First Prize awarded by the Jury and the Audience Prize

Other prizes
 2006–“Radio Romania Cultural” Broadcast Channel awarded Alina the special Prize "In memoriam Iosif Sava"
 2004–The "Artistic Performances" Prize awarded by the Romanian Society of Radio Broadcast, Bucharest
 2004–The special prize awarded by the Ministry of Foreign Affairs "For Promoting Romania Through Culture", Bucharest
 The Prize "The Young of the Year 2003" awarded by the “Monitorul Expres” Journal of Brasov (Transylvania)

Charity concerts
 In The Netherlands (October 2008) "Concerto for Alexandra" held in the Roermond, a project supported by the Dutch Foundation "Heart for Romania" to collecting funds for building a special school for blind children in Sibiu.
 In Switzerland, (August 2004 and May 2007) organized by the International Rotary Club for a Romanian music school of orgs in Harman / Brasov
 In Romania, on the occasion of the inauguration of the Hospice Medical Care Centre (June 2002) and for fund raising required for the building of a modern surgery unit at the Children’s Hospital from Brasov (November 2003) organized by the International Rotary Club. In December 2005 "Christmas Concert" for the elderly home in Brasov.
 In Indonesia (12–14 November 2001) three concerts for the financing of a rehabilitation program for physically challenged children,
 In Germany (March 2000) for hospitals and elderly homes (Wuppertal, Essen, Bochum)

References

External links
 Alina's official website
 Trialoguemusical.de
 "Piano Recital Featuring Alina Bercu", The Romanian Ambassador‘s Residence, Washington, DC, November 4, 2004
 Sonatas Outhere Music

Living people
1990 births
Romanian classical pianists
Romanian women pianists
People from Câmpina
Eurovision Young Musicians Finalists
21st-century classical pianists
Women classical pianists
21st-century women pianists